Association Sportive Matelots is a Cameroonian football club based in Bafoussam. It is a member of the Fédération Camerounaise de Football. They currently compete in MTN Elite Ligue 2, which is level 2 in the Cameroon football pyramid.

Football clubs in Cameroon
Sports clubs in Cameroon